The Columbus Stars were a minor league baseball team from Columbus, Georgia, that played in the Southern League in 1885. The team left the league two weeks before the scheduled end of the season with a 49–47 (.510) record.

References 

Southern League (1885–1899) teams
Baseball teams established in 1885
Baseball teams disestablished in 1885
Sports in Columbus, Georgia
Professional baseball teams in Georgia (U.S. state)
1885 establishments in Georgia (U.S. state)
1885 disestablishments in Georgia (U.S. state)
Defunct baseball teams in Georgia